A Night to Remember is a 1958 British historical disaster docudrama film based on the eponymous 1955 book by Walter Lord. The film and book recount the final night of RMS Titanic, which sank on her maiden voyage after she struck an iceberg in 1912. Adapted by Eric Ambler and directed by Roy Ward Baker, the film stars Kenneth More as the ship's Second Officer Charles Lightoller and features Michael Goodliffe, Laurence Naismith, Kenneth Griffith, David McCallum and Tucker McGuire. It was filmed in the United Kingdom and tells the story of the sinking, portraying the main incidents and players in a documentary-style fashion with considerable attention to detail. The production team, supervised by producer William MacQuitty (who saw the original ship launched) used blueprints of the ship to create authentic sets, while Fourth Officer Joseph Boxhall and ex-Cunard Commodore Harry Grattidge worked as technical advisors on the film. Its estimated budget of up to £600,000 (£ adjusted for inflation []) was exceptional and made it the most expensive film ever made in Britain up to that time. The film's score was written by William Alwyn. 

The film disappointed at the box office. However, it received critical acclaim and won the 1959 "Samuel Goldwyn International Award" for the UK at the Golden Globe Awards. Among the many films about the Titanic, A Night to Remember is regarded highly by Titanic historians and survivors for its accuracy, despite its modest production values, compared with the Oscar-winning film Titanic (1997).

Plot 

In 1912, the luxurious Titanic is the largest vessel afloat and is widely believed to be unsinkable. On 10 April, Titanic sails from Southampton on her maiden voyage to New York. On 14 April, in the Atlantic, the ship receives a number of ice warnings from steamers, which are relayed to Captain Edward J. Smith, who orders a lookout. That evening, the  spots float ice in the distance, and tries to send a message to Titanic. On Titanic, First Class passengers Sir Richard and Lady Richard, and Second Class passengers, the Clarkes, a young newlywed couple, overhear the band, led by Wallace Hartley, playing various songs, while steerage passengers Pat Murphy, Martin Gallagher and James Farrel enjoy a party in Third Class where Murphy becomes attracted to a young Polish girl and dances with her. In the wireless room, operators Jack Phillips and Harold Bride are changing shifts. Phillips receives an ice warning, but when more messages arrive for him to send out, the warning is lost under them. On the Californian, field ice is spotted. The ship stops due to the risk, and a message is sent to Titanic. Because the Californian is so close, the message is very loud, and Phillips cuts it off abruptly. Titanics passengers begin to settle in for the night, while gamblers Hoyle and Jay Yates stay up.

Suddenly, the vessel collides with an iceberg. Captain Smith sends for Thomas Andrews, the ship's builder, to inspect the damage, who determines that Titanic will sink within two hours, and both realize it lacks sufficient lifeboat capacity. Distress signals are sent out, but the Californians radio operator is off duty. 58 miles away, the  radio operator receives the distress call and alerts Captain Arthur Rostron, who orders the ship to turn around. Unfortunately, it will take around four hours to reach Titanic. Seeing the Californian on the horizon 10 miles away, Titanic begins to signal the ship, but the Californians crew fails to comprehend why a ship they are in sight of is firing rockets, as Captain Smith orders Second Officer Charles Lightoller to start lowering the lifeboats, while the orchestra perform ragtime. In the Grand Staircase, passenger Robbie Lucas is told the truth by Andrews and he gets his wife and children safely in a boat. Murphy, Gallagher and Farrel help the Polish girl and her mother to the boat deck and get them to a boat. The Richards and Hoyle are admitted to a boat by First Officer William McMaster Murdoch. Yates gives a female passenger a note to send to his sister. Ida and Isidor Straus refuse to be separated, inadvertently setting an example for Mrs. Clarke, who decides to stay with her husband until Andrews advises them on how to survive.

As the crew struggles to hold back the third-class passengers, most first- and second-class passengers board lifeboats and row away. As Titanic lists, passengers begin to realize the danger; when the third-class passengers are finally allowed up, chaos ensues. White Star Line Chairman J. Bruce Ismay steps into one of the last lifeboats. Passengers, among them Murphy, Gallagher and Farrel, retreat towards the stern as it rises into the air while Lightoller and other able seamen struggle to free the two remaining collapsible lifeboats, as the Titanics bow submerges and Captain Smith gives the order to abandon ship, and every man for himself. The Clarkes use a rope to get down the ship's side and the orchestra performs the hymn, "Nearer, My God, to Thee", as Smith returns to the bridge to go down with his ship. Titanic begins its final plunge; Lightoller and many others are swept off. Andrews awaits his fate in the first-class smoking room, while a kindly steward comforts a lost boy separated from his mother. Lucas looks out towards the lifeboats, realizing he will never see his family again, while the Clarkes are killed by a falling funnel. The passengers pray as the stricken liner rapidly sinks into the icy ocean.

In the freezing water, many people die of hypothermia. Lucas' dead body floats by a overturned collapsible, as Yates, unwilling to overcrowd the boat, swims away to his death. Lightoller takes charge on the boat as Murphy and Gallagher make it aboard, though Farrel is lost. Chief Baker Charles Joughin, after having given up his lifeboat seat and turning to the bottle to ease his ailments, also climbs aboard. The men are saved by another boat. The Carpathia arrives to rescue the survivors, as a shaken Lightoller tells Colonel Archibald Gracie that he "don't think I'll ever feel sure again, about anything." On the ship, as a group prayer is held, Murphy and Gallagher stand with the Polish girl and her mother, while Mrs. Farrel and Mrs. Lucas and her children mourn the loss of their loved ones. Rostron informs Lightoller that 705 were saved and 1,500 lost. The Carpathia receives a message from the Californian, which heard of the disaster, but Rostron informs them that "everything that was humanly possible has been done."

Cast

 Kenneth More as Second Officer Charles Herbert Lightoller 
 Michael Goodliffe as shipbuilder Thomas Andrews
 Laurence Naismith as Captain Edward J. Smith
 Kenneth Griffith as Wireless Operator Jack Phillips
 David McCallum as Assistant Wireless Operator Harold Bride
 Tucker McGuire as Mrs. Margaret "Molly" Brown
 Frank Lawton as chairman and managing director of the White Star Line J. Bruce Ismay
 Richard Leech as First Officer William McMaster Murdoch
 John Cairney as Mr. Murphy
 Richard Clarke as Martin Gallagher
 Patrick McAlinney as Mr. James Farrell  
 Anthony Bushell as Captain Arthur Rostron
 Alec McCowen as Wireless Operator Harold Thomas Cottam, RMS Carpathia
 Ronald Allen as Mr. Clarke 
 Jill Dixon as Mrs. Clarke  
 Geoffrey Bayldon as Wireless Operator Cyril Evans, SS Californian
 George Rose as Chief Baker Charles Joughin
 John Merivale as Robbie Lucas
 Honor Blackman as Mrs. Liz Lucas
 Robert Ayres as Arthur Godfrey Peuchen
 Ralph Michael as Jay Yates
 James Dyrenforth as Colonel Archibald Gracie IV
 Russell Napier as Captain Stanley Lord
 Jane Downs as Iowa Sylvania Zillah "Sylvia" Hawley-Wilson (Mrs. Sylvia Lightoller)
 Patrick Waddington as Sir Richard 
 Harriette Johns as Lady Richard 
 Redmond Phillips as Mr. Hoyle
 Joseph Tomelty as Dr. William O'Loughlin
 Jack Watling as Fourth Officer Joseph Boxhall
 Michael Bryant as Sixth Officer James Paul Moody
 Howard Lang as Chief Officer Henry Tingle Wilde (uncredited)
 Cyril Chamberlain as Quartermaster Rowe
 Bee Duffell as Mrs. Farrell
 Harold Goldblatt as Benjamin Guggenheim
 Gerald Harper as Third Officer, RMS Carpathia
 Thomas Heathcote as Steward
 Andrew Keir as Second Engineer Officer John Henry 'Harry' Hesketh
 Howard Pays as Fifth Officer Harold Lowe
 Harold Siddons as Second Officer Herbert Stone, SS Californian
 Julian Somers as Mr. Bull
 Rosamund Greenwood as Mrs. Bull (uncredited)
 Arthur Gross as Quartermaster Hichens (uncredited)
 Charles Belchier as Bandleader Wallace Hartley (uncredited)
 Emerton Court as Chief Engineer Joseph G. Bell (uncredited)
 Teresa Thorne as Miss Edith Russell (uncredited)
 John Moulder Brown as boy (uncredited)
 Henry Campbell as William T. Stead (uncredited)
 Larry Taylor as bearded seaman (uncredited)
 Alma Taylor as old woman who leaves her seat to a young mother on the lifeboat (uncredited)
 Ray Austin as seaman (high fall into water stunt) (uncredited)
 Edward Malin as Dining Saloon Steward
 John Martin as Lost Boy (uncredited)
 Victor Wood as Steward (uncredited)
 Richard Shaw as Crewman (uncredited)
 Jack Stewart as Stoker Barrett (uncredited)
 Olwen Brookes as Miss Evans (uncredited)
 Paul Hardwick as Guggenheim's Valet (uncredited)
 Larry Taylor as Life Boat passenger (uncredited)
 

Cast notes:
 Gordon Holdom - baritone, sang the song "Nearer, My God, to Thee" dubbed.
 Desmond Llewelyn makes an uncredited appearance as a gate steward who prevents the third class passengers from entering the first class deck. 
 Peter Burton makes an appearance as a steward. 
 Bernard Fox, who appears as Lookout Frederick Fleet, also appears as Colonel Archibald Gracie IV in Titanic (1997).
 By coincidence, four members of the cast, Peter Burton, Desmond Llewelyn, Geoffrey Bayldon and Alec McCowen, went on to play "Q" in various James Bond movies.
 Two cast members –  Llewelyn and Blackman – would later appear in the 1964 James Bond film Goldfinger. 
 Norman Rossington, who appears as a steward who loses his temper with non-English speaking passengers just after the collision, also appears as the Master-at-Arms in S.O.S. Titanic (1979).
 Jeremy Bulloch, best known for his portrayal of Boba Fett in the Star Wars films The Empire Strikes Back and Return of the Jedi, makes an uncredited appearance as a boy jumping into water.
 Derren Nesbitt and Stratford Johns appear uncredited as survivors on the upturned lifeboat.
 Frank Lawton, who plays J. Bruce Ismay, previously starred in 1933's Cavalcade, which also prominently featured the Titanic.
 This is the last movie for Alma Taylor, very famous actress in Silent film era.
 David McCallum, who plays Harold Bride, would serve as the narrator for the 1994 A&E documentary mini-series Titanic: Death of a Dream and Titanic: The Legend Lives On.

Production

Original book
The film is based on Walter Lord's book A Night to Remember (1955), but in Ray Johnson's documentary The Making of 'A Night to Remember''' (1993), Lord says that when he wrote his book, there was no mass interest in the Titanic, and he was the first writer in four decades to attempt a grand-scale history of the disaster, synthesizing written sources and survivors' firsthand accounts. Lord dated the genesis of his interest in the subject to childhood. So did producer MacQuitty, who had vivid memories of, as a boy of six, watching the launch of the Titanic at the Harland and Wolff shipyard in Belfast on 31 May 1911 and seeing it depart on its maiden voyage the following April.

1956 television adaptation

The book had previously been adapted as a live American TV production, screened by NBC and sponsored by Kraft Foods as part of the Kraft Television Theatre series on 28 March 1956. It has been described as "the biggest, most lavish, most expensive thing of its kind" attempted up to that point, with 31 sets, 107 actors, 72 speaking parts, and 3,000 gallons of water and costing $95,000 ($ at  prices). George Roy Hill directed and Claude Rains narrated – a practice borrowed from radio dramas, which provided a template for many television dramas of the time. It took a similar approach to the book, lacking dominant characters and switching between a multiplicity of scenes. Rains' narration was used "to bridge the almost limitless number of sequences of life aboard the doomed liner", as a reviewer put it, and closed with his declaration that "never again has Man been so confident. An age had come to an end."

The production was a major hit, attracting 28 million viewers, and greatly boosted the book's sales. It was rerun on kinescope on 2 May 1956, five weeks after its first broadcast.

Development
The film adaptation came about after its eventual director, Roy Ward Baker, and its producer, Belfast-born William MacQuitty, both acquired copies of the book -– Baker from his favorite bookshop and MacQuitty from his wife – and decided to obtain the film rights. MacQuitty succeeded in raising finance from John Davis at the Rank Organisation, who in the late 1950s were expanding into bigger-budgeted filmmaking. The job of directing was assigned to Roy Baker, who was under contract to Rank, and Baker recommended Ambler be given the job of writing the screenplay. Lord was brought on board the production as a consultant.

In addition to basing the script – both in action and dialogue – on Lord's book, the filmmakers achieved nuanced performances and authentic atmosphere by consulting several actual Titanic survivors, who served as technical advisors. Among them were Fourth Officer Joseph Boxhall and passengers Edith Russell and Lawrence Beesley. One day during shooting, Beesley famously gatecrashed the set. He infiltrated the set during the sinking scene, hoping to 'go down with the ship', but was discovered by the director, who ordered him off and vetoed this unscheduled appearance due to actors' union rules. Thus, as Julian Barnes puts it, "for the second time in his life, Beesley left the Titanic just before it was due to go down." Charles Lightoller's widow Sylvia Lightoller was also consulted during production, at one point visiting Pinewood Studios and meeting with Kenneth More, whom she introduced to her children on set. Sylvia commended More for his portrayal of her husband. When Helen Melville Smith, Captain Smith's daughter, visited the set, she was overcome by the striking physical resemblance between Laurence Naismith and her father.

There were numerous changes made to the real events to increase the drama and appeal, however. For example, there is a limited involvement of American passengers (with the exception of the Strauses, Guggenheim, Molly Brown and Colonel Gracie), and several characters based on Americans are depicted as being British. When questioned as to why he did this, Roy Baker noted that "it was a British film made by British artists for a British audience". Also, the film diverges from both the book and the NBC TV adaptation in focusing on a central character, Second Officer Charles Lightoller, who does and says some things that other crewmembers are reported to have done and said during the actual disaster. Its conclusion reflects Lord's world-historical theme of a "world changed for ever" with a fictional conversation between Lightoller and Colonel Archibald Gracie, sitting on a lifeboat. Lightoller declares that the disaster is "different ... Because we were so sure. Because even though it's happened, it's still unbelievable. I don't think I'll ever feel sure again. About anything."  Rank wanted a star for the part, so it was offered to Kenneth More, who accepted. It was the first movie he made under a new contract with Rank to make seven films in five years at a fee of £40,000 a film (about £ in  terms, with a total of £6,600,000 for all seven films).

Producer MacQuitty had originally contracted with Shaw, Savill & Albion Line to use its former flagship  to shoot scenes for the film, but the company pulled out of the production at the last minute, citing that they did not want to use one of their liners to recreate the Titanic sinking. However, according to MacQuitty, the Shaw Savill Line at the time was managed by Basil Sanderson, son of Harold Sanderson, the White Star Line's director in the U.S. at the time of the sinking. Harold Sanderson would later succeed J. Bruce Ismay as president of the International Mercantile Marine Company, J.P. Morgan's shipping conglomerate that owned the White Star Line. This connection to White Star, according to MacQuitty, is what actually led the Shaw Savill Line to pull out of the film. MacQuitty eventually got permission from Ship Breaking Industries in Faslane, Scotland to film scenes aboard , a 1920s ocean liner that the company was scrapping. The liner's port side had been demolished, but its starboard was still intact, so MacQuitty got art students to paint the liner the White Star Line colors and used mirrors to recreate scenes that took place on the port side. 30 sets were constructed using the builders' original plans for Titanic.

Shooting
Filming began 15 October 1957 at Pinewood Studios. It went until 5 March 1958. When the set was being raised at an angle, the microphones picked up the sounds of the set creaking. The director kept them in the sinking scenes because they made the scenes more realistic. The last shot to be filmed was Sir Richard and Lady Richard' departure from their home pass the waving orphans according to Ray Johnson's documentary The Making of 'A Night to Remember' (1993).

Kenneth Moore recalled the production of the film in his autobiography, published 20 years later in 1978. There was no tank big enough at Pinewood Studios to film the survivors struggling to climb into lifeboats, so it was done in the open-air swimming bath at Ruislip Lido, at 2:00 am on an icy November morning. When the extras refused to jump in, Moore realised he would have to set an example. He called out: "Come on!"

{{blockquote|I leaped. Never have I experienced such cold in all my life. It was like jumping into a deep freeze. The shock forced the breath out of my body. My heart seemed to stop beating. I felt crushed, unable to think. I had rigor mortis, without the mortis. And then I surfaced, spat out the dirty water and, gasping for breath, found my voice.

"Stop!" I shouted. "Don't listen to me! It's bloody awful! Stay where you are!"

But it was too late ....<ref>"</ref>}}

Four clips from the Nazi propaganda film Titanic (1943) were used in A Night to Remember; two of the ship sailing in calm waters during the day, and two of a flooding walkway in the engine room. As Brian Hawkins writes, the British came closest "to the Titanic truth in 1958 with their black-and-white production of Walter Lord's novel A Night to Remember, seamlessly incorporating sequences from director Herbert Selpin's 1943 (Nazi) Titanic without giving any screen credits for these incredible scenes." Selpin himself was arrested on instruction from Propaganda Minister Joseph Goebbels over the course of production in early August 1942 for offering a negative opinion of the German military while directing this earlier Nazi-era film. He was then found dead in his prison cell.

Historical accuracy
 
The film is regarded as the most historically accurate Titanic film, with the exception of not featuring the ship breaking in half. (There was still doubt about the fact she split in two when the book and film were produced. The accepted view at the time and the result of the inquiries was that she sank intact; it was only confirmed that she split after the wreck was found in 1985.) Lightoller's widow Sylvia Lightoller praised the film's historical accuracy in an interview with The Guardian, stating "The film is really the truth and has not been embroidered".

While some events are based on true history, some of the characters and their storylines are fictional or dramatised; the characters of Mr. Murphy, Mr. Hoyle, and Jay Yates being composites of several men. Murphy, who leads the steerage girls to the lifeboat, is a composite of several Irish emigrants. Although there was, in fact, a Martin Gallagher travelling steerage aboard the Titanic, his actions in the film are fictionalised and though he survives the sinking, he actually died in real life. Hoyle, the gambler who gets into the lifeboat on the starboard side, is a composite of several such figures, men determined to save themselves at all costs. Robbie Lucas and Mrs. Liz Lucas are composites of several married couples, notably Mr. Lucian P. Smith and Mrs. Eloise Hughes Smith. Lucas even says the words actually spoken by Lucien Smith to his wife: "I never expected to ask you to obey me, but this is one time you must". Mr. Clarke and Mrs. Clarke are composites of several honeymoon couples, notably Mr. John Chapman and Mrs. Sarah Chapman, a pair of newlyweds from second-class who died in the sinking. John Chapman's body was recovered by the cable ship Mackay-Bennett, and there were no mentions or indications that suggest that he had been killed by a falling funnel. The involvement of American passengers was either limited or left out (with the exception of the Strauses, Guggenheim, Molly Brown and Colonel Gracie).

Several historical figures were renamed or went unnamed to avoid potential legal action. Sir Cosmo Duff-Gordon and Lucy, Lady Duff-Gordon are depicted as Sir Richard and Lady Richard (Lady Duff's secretary Miss Francatelli is completely omitted) and Bruce Ismay is referred to throughout only as "The Chairman".

The film omits several key historical figures, including John Jacob Astor IV, the wealthiest passenger aboard Titanic, and Stoker Frederick Barrett, with Second Engineer Officer John Henry Hesketh's role being expanded to include duties and actions that were performed by Barrett and others.

In reality, the American gambler Jay Yates (played as British by the distinctive British actor Ralph Michael), travelling under the name of J.H. Rogers, was never on board the Titanic and the note he was said to have handed to a passenger was a hoax. Yates wrote the note in New York and then had a woman accomplice pose as a survivor and deliver the note to the newspaper. Yates did this in order to make the police think he was dead. They didn't fall for the ruse, though, and Yates was captured a couple of months after the sinking. (He was wanted on federal charges connected with postal thefts.) The fictional Yates says, "Good luck and God bless you", the words spoken by an unknown swimmer at Collapsible B, who survivor fireman Walter Hurst thought was Captain Smith.

The film was also clearly intended as a vehicle for its main star, Kenneth More, who played Lightoller. Throughout the sinking, Lightoller is shown personally loading nearly every lifeboat. In reality, many of Lightoller's actions were performed by other officers.

This was an error made by Walter Lord in his research, which he acknowledged in the documentary The Making of A Night to Remember.

The first scene of A Night to Remember depicts the christening of the ship at its launch. However, the Titanic was never christened, as it was not the practice of the White Star Line to stand on this sort of ceremony, and this has come down in popular lore as one of the many contributing factors to the ship's "bad luck".

Stanley Lord was upset over his negative portrayal by the actor Russell Napier, which depicted him as in his warm cabin in his pyjamas in bed asleep when Titanic was sinking. Stanley Lord was sleeping in the chart room with his uniform on at the time of the disaster.

Lightoller is depicted nearly being crushed by the fourth funnel falling in the ship's last moments. It was actually the first funnel that fell near Lightoller.

Murphy and Gallagher make it to the overturned Collapsible B with a child in their arms, which they pass to Lightoller. Lightoller realises the child is dead and puts it back in the water. This was inspired by several accounts that Captain Smith reportedly carried a child to the boat, which later died. Along with these accounts being of dubious nature, Lightoller never reported receiving a child on Collapsible B.

Release
The world premiere was on Thursday, 3 July 1958, at the Odeon Leicester Square. Boxhall and Third Officer Herbert Pitman attended the premier along with survivor Walter Nichols. Titanic survivor Elizabeth Dowdell attended the American premiere in New York on Tuesday 16 December 1958.

Reception

Critical reception
Upon its December 1958 U.S. premiere, Bosley Crowther called the film a "tense, exciting and supremely awesome drama...[that] puts the story of the great disaster in simple human terms and yet brings it all into a drama of monumental unity and scope"; according to Crowther:

this remarkable picture is a brilliant and moving account of the behavior of the people on the Titanic on that night that should never be forgotten. It is an account of the casualness and flippancy of most of the people right after the great ship has struck (even though an ominous cascade of water is pouring into her bowels); of the slow accumulation of panic that finally mounts to a human holocaust, of shockingly ugly bits of baseness and of wonderfully brave and noble deeds.

The film won numerous awards, including a Golden Globe Award for Best English-Language Foreign Film, and received high praise from reviewers on both sides of the Atlantic.

Box office
The film was one of the twenty most popular films of the year in Britain according to Motion Picture Herald, but it was only a modest commercial success due to the size of its original budget and its relative underperformance at the American box office.

Kinematograph Weekly listed it as being "in the money" at the British box office in 1958.

By 2001, it had still not made a profit, in part because it was issued as part of a slate of ten films and all of its profits were cross-collateralised.

Reputation today
According to Professor Paul Heyer, the film helped to spark the wave of disaster films that included The Poseidon Adventure (1972) and The Towering Inferno (1974). Heyer comments that it "still stands as the definitive cinematic telling of the story and the prototype and finest example of the disaster-film genre." On Rotten Tomatoes, the film has a "certified fresh" score of 100% based on 20 reviews, with an average score of 8.71/10. The film has been described as "the definitive cinematic telling of the story." It is considered "the best Titanic film before Titanic (1997)", "the most accurate of all Titanic films", and "the definitive Titanic tale", especially for its social realism, reflecting, in the words of one critic, "the overwhelming historical evidence that the class rigidity of 1912, for all its defects, produced a genuine sense of behavioural obligation on the Titanic among rich and poor alike; that the greatest number of people aboard faced death or hardship with a stoic and selfless grace that the world has wondered at for most of this century." Film critic Barry Norman called it "more moving" than Titanic". Andrew Collins of Empire gave the film five out of five stars, writing that "this is a landmark in British cinema, as good today as it's always been".

Home video
A Night to Remember was released by the the Criterion Collection on DVD in May 1998. Initial versions of the DVD omitted Lightoller finding the child to be dead and putting it in the water. A new DVD and a high-definition Blu-ray edition were released on 27 March 2012 to commemorate the centennial of the sinking.

See also
 List of films about the RMS Titanic
 RMS Titanic in popular culture

References

Bibliography

External links
 
 
 
 
 A Night to Remember an essay by Michael Sragow at the Criterion Collection

1958 films
1950s German-language films
Polish-language films
1950s Italian-language films
1950s Russian-language films
1958 drama films
British drama films
British disaster films
British docudrama films
Films based on non-fiction books
Films directed by Roy Ward Baker
Films set in 1912
Films set on ships
Films about RMS Titanic
Films shot at Pinewood Studios
Films scored by William Alwyn
1950s disaster films
Seafaring films based on actual events
1950s survival films
Drama films based on actual events
British survival films
1950s English-language films
1950s British films